Marcoot is an extinct town in Reynolds County, in the U.S. state of Missouri. The GNIS classifies it as a populated place.

A post office called Marcoot was established in 1905, and remained in operation until 1938. It is unknown why the name "Marcoot" was applied to this community.

References

Ghost towns in Missouri
Former populated places in Reynolds County, Missouri